Ryan James Murray (born September 27, 1993) is a Canadian professional ice hockey defenceman for the Edmonton Oilers of the National Hockey League (NHL). Murray was drafted second overall by the Columbus Blue Jackets in the 2012 NHL Entry Draft. Murray won the Stanley Cup with the Colorado Avalanche in 2022.

Playing career

Junior
Murray was drafted ninth overall by the Everett Silvertips at the 2008 WHL Bantam Draft. He was later named captain of the team for the start of his third season in Everett.

Professional

Columbus Blue Jackets
On June 22, 2012, he was chosen second overall by the Columbus Blue Jackets at the 2012 NHL Entry Draft after he was ranked second among North American skaters in the NHL Central Scouting list. The following month on July 24, 2012, Murray signed a three-year entry-level contract with the Blue Jackets. On November 16, 2012, Murray injured his shoulder during a game with the Silvertips. He would later undergo shoulder surgery and miss the rest of the WHL season (also making him unavailable for NHL play).

Murray played his first NHL game on October 4, 2013, against the Calgary Flames. He scored his first NHL goal on October 25, 2013, against Jonathan Bernier of the Toronto Maple Leafs. Murray has missed a significant amount of time due to injuries, missing over 35% of his first five seasons in the NHL.

On February 11, 2016, the Blue Jackets re-signed Murray to a two-year, $5.65 million contract. Injuries continued to reduce his playing time and, after missing nearly half the games in the 2017–18 NHL season, he signed a one-year qualifying offer from the Blue Jackets on July 14, 2018. On July 1, 2019, Murray signed a two-year, $9.2 million contract with the Blue Jackets.

New Jersey Devils
After seven seasons with the Blue Jackets, on October 8, 2020, Murray was traded to the New Jersey Devils in exchange for a 2021 fifth-round draft pick. In the shortened  season, Murray registered 14 assists through 48 regular season games with the rebuilding Devils.

Colorado Avalanche
On August 2, 2021, as a free agent from the Devils, Murray was signed to a one-year, $2 million contract with the Colorado Avalanche. He began the  season, placed in a third-pairing role with the Avalanche, making his debut on opening night in a 4-2 victory over the Chicago Blackhawks on October 13, 2021. He registered his first points with the Avalanche, recording 2 assists in a 4-3 win over the St. Louis Blues on October 28, 2021. He appeared in 17 out of 18 games with Colorado before suffering a lower body injury against the Nashville Predators on November 27, 2021.

Edmonton Oilers
As a free agent following his Stanley Cup accomplishment with the Avalanche, Murray was signed to a one-year, $750,000 contract with the Edmonton Oilers on September 2, 2022.

International play

Murray participated at the 2012 World Junior Ice Hockey Championships held in Calgary and Edmonton and won the bronze medal.

In 2012, Murray became the first draft eligible player to represent Team Canada at the World Championship in many years. Murray became the second youngest Team Canada player to play in the tournament (the youngest was Paul Kariya in 1993). Four years later, Murray again played for Canada, winning gold at the 2016 World Championship. Murray was also named to Team Canada to compete at the 2018 IIHF World Championship.

Career statistics

Regular season and playoffs

International

Awards and honours

References

External links

1993 births
Living people
Canadian ice hockey defencemen
Cleveland Monsters players
Colorado Avalanche players
Columbus Blue Jackets draft picks
Columbus Blue Jackets players
Edmonton Oilers players
Everett Silvertips players
Ice hockey people from Saskatchewan
National Hockey League first-round draft picks
New Jersey Devils players
Stanley Cup champions